The 1900 Southern Intercollegiate Athletic Association football season was the college football games played by the member schools of the Southern Intercollegiate Athletic Association as part of the 1900 college football season. The season  began on September 29.

The season saw the rise of Clemson's football program, the return of Alabama football, and the first season of play for Henry D. Phillips.

Results and team statistics

Key

PPG = Average of points scored per game
PAG = Average of points allowed per game

Regular season

SIAA teams in bold.

Week One

Week Two

Week Three

Week Four

Week Five

Week Six

Week Seven

Week Eight

Week Nine

Week Ten

Awards and honors

All-Southerns

E - Frank M. Osborne, North Carolina (O)
T - Frank Bennett, North Carolina (O, WH)
G - Big Sam, Texas (O)
C - William Poole, Sewanee (O)
HB - Henry Seibels, Sewanee (O)
FB - Ormond Simkins, Sewanee (O, WH [as end])

References